Jack C. Mancino (born as Balogh Csaba in 1968 in Hungary), is a contemporary Abstract Expressionist Painter, Graphic Artist, Photographer, Actor, Director, Musician living in the United Kingdom England.

Biography 
Jack C. Mancino was born in Hungary in 1968. He grew up in the riverside industrial small town called Leninvaros (Tiszaujvaros) (eastern region of Hungary) at 14 He moved to Szazhalombatta with his mother, near Budapest. He was ten when he started to study art painting, graphical portrait, graphical landscapes drawing. At the beginning of his study, he liked to copying art paintings using oil and acrylic paint that helped him to get the very important basic techniques. In 1980 at age of 12, he moved to (Halle Neustadt) Germany with his family. That short period of time he made improvement in the study of graphical drawing and acrylic painting due to copying comic book themes to sketchbooks and posters. When the family moved back to Hungary he felt that he wanted to make a major improvement in art but there was insufficient support by the local art teachers. Until 17 he lived in Hungary studying in an Industrial engineering school learning drafting in mechanical drawing. In 1986 he moved back to north Germany. He worked in a nuclear power plant in the northern seaside region where he got a big impact by the different land and seascapes. He remembered: "I was watching the sea all day long and I almost lost my job because of it". At that time due to plenty of working hours he was unable to focus on artistic activity. He spent a year in Germany when he moved to Canada (Toronto). He learned that the art themes on canvas were totally different in the western world compared to the art that was promoted in the communist era. Later he stated: "There was a style what was so free with its own system of rules". He started to learn more about abstract and surrealism. The modern art gave him a new tunnel of viewpoints and of color usage. (Kandinsky, Picasso, Rothko).

When he moved back to Hungary he still studied art and graphics with commercial design, mechanical drawing but in the same time, he got involved with the heavy industrial business to focus on industrial maintenance and structure building in the chemical and oil industry. When he sold his heavy industrial company at 30 he moved back to Canada ( Toronto) There he started to make progression with more focus on art by studying more about abstract expressionism and surrealism. Since 2005 he lives in the UK (England). He stated:"I finally find my own style, within the modern abstract expressionism. I try to archive situations, shapes, fields, feelings, urban themes as abstractions with vibrant colorization with my own naive and raw shapes. I'm actually unable to specify my own style. Right now I`m very much in love with Abstract expressionism."

Work

Art 

Mancino's work in abstract expressionism and suprematism is mainly based on artworks of earlier abstract expressionists from the early and middle of the 20th century. His earliest work comprised classical landscapes and still life compositions but his later work focused on the art theories of abstract painters like Wassily Kandinsky, Mark Rothko and Jackson Pollock. The change helped him establish his own artistic style within abstract expressionism. Since then he has followed the New York School of abstract expressionism . The technical elements of his art theory show the balanced application of either precise or raw objects relations. The communicative compositions are systemically related with impulsive color surroundings; the artistic application of his works are also characterized by strong vibrant colorization and raw geometrical shape composition or structuring. The use of geometrical shapes reflect Suprematism, although he preferred to call his style "Fragmented Geometrical Abstract."

Mancino's "A" collection began around 1992; his "B" collection series started after 2000.

Early classical stage
In his early years, he made study on Hungarian classical artists works such as Mihaly Munkacsy and Laszlo Paal. At the beginning of his career he was mostly influenced by classical and surreal (Dalí) themes. At his classical landscape or still life pieces, the viewer can easily recognize the prominent modern contemporary elements such as vivid colorization and wild, raw brush strokes, abstract or geometrical balance, as well as the degree of elaboration of objects and crudity.  In his earlier works, the use of vivid color surroundings point out to his later style and also shows his vibrant personality. One of the great examples of this feature is the Blue Bay, and The Hungarian Plain series. The colors of the scene of the Great Hungarian Plain show modern abstraction features that are not used by the classical painters in their realistic color settings. The dynamic usage of colors gives a new styled appearance and lends a touch of abstract style in the classic landscape theme.

Change to Abstract 

Keeping his respect towards classical art in 1987 he changed the focus on his art interest in Canada. In the western culture styled world surroundings started to look out for more color and different concepts in art. He started to recognize themes and conceptions in the abstract and abstract expressionism using more color and more geometric relations than he used in his classical art progression. According to him, "Every artist reaches the target only when they are able to give the viewer something in emotion and emotion is not a subject of mastered complexity or definition of school degree or details". His basic – and always kept in mind – principle that is actually "Schools often prevent the individual mind to create something genuine". Following the American abstract expressionist's free theory, in his creations, the viewer can recognize large color space conceptions and also some kind of unschooled freedom. In his art, the elaboration and vibrant color combination create subliminal communication. The application of mostly basic shape conception and color relation creates a clear and firm unique style seen by outside observers, although some modern contemporary art collectors compare his work to Jean-Michel Basquiat.

Film 
Jack C. Mancino started writing film scripts in 2000 in Toronto, Canada. He's been filming short films since 2001. His first short film titled The Boxer - The Journey of Felix Gruber was filmed and released in 2005 as festival short and video. The movie is a romantic, comical silent adventure about a bohemian boxer in 1940`s New York City who is involved in an illegal boxing match bet which accidentally leads to a wild adventure. In 2013 he started filming a feature film as director and actor in the independent film titled; The Seventh Page, which movie was released in 2018. The 2005 short film character Felix Gruber was adapted to the story of The Seventh Page by Mancino. The plot connects the classical and modern sci-fi film styles into a comic book styled thriller drama. The actual plot is about dreams look and feel like reality. Prof. Jack Taylor (Jack C. Mancino) tests a newly developed digital environment called 'Vivid Dreams'. While being monitored by artificial intelligence that wants to collect vital information from his brain, he pretty much gets confused when his mind gets mixed with fantasies from other subconsciouses. There's nothing worse than an obvious conspiracy. You never dream alone.  The second episode of The Seventh Page titled The Journey expected to be released in 2022.

References

External links 

 Mancino Filming Official
 Mancino Official
 Mancino Artmajeur France
 Fragmented Geometry N 7 in SAATCHI Gallery online Abstract collection
 Mancino on Saatchi Gallery Online 
  Jack C.Mancino Style 
 Fine Art America Jack C Mancino Abstract Art
 Jack Mancino Art 
 Jack Mancino Art page
 Art, Film,Jack C Mancino - képek
 Filming Star Now
 Jack C. Mancino - The African on iTunes
 

Hungarian painters
1968 births
Living people